USS St. George (CVE-17) (originally AVG-17 then ACV-17) was laid down on 31 July 1941 as a C3-S-A2 by Ingalls Shipbuilding, Hull 296 of Pascagoula, Mississippi, under Maritime Commission contract as the (second) SS Mormacland for Moore-McCormack Lines, Inc.,  (MC Hull 163). She was renamed St. George (AVG-17) by the United States Navy on 7 January 1942; and assigned to the United Kingdom under Lend-Lease as HMS Pursuer on 24 February 1942. The vessel was launched on 18 July 1942, sponsored by Mrs. Mary Ann S. Bartman. The escort carrier was reclassified ACV-17 on 20 August 1942, acquired by the US Navy and simultaneously transferred to Britain on 14 June 1943. She was reclassified CVE-17 on 15 July 1943.

Design and description

There were eight s in service with the Royal Navy during the Second World War. They were built between 1941 and 1942 by the Ingalls Shipbuilding and Western Pipe & Steel shipyards in the United States, both building four ships each.

The vessels had a complement of 646 officers and ratings and crew accommodation was different from the normal Royal Navy's arrangements. The separate messes no longer had to prepare their own food, as everything was cooked in the galley and served cafeteria style in a central dining area. They were also equipped with a modern laundry and a barber shop. The traditional hammocks were replaced by three tier bunk beds, eighteen to a cabin which were hinged and could be tied up to provide extra space when not in use.

Aircraft facilities were a small combined bridge–flight control on the starboard side above the  flight deck, two aircraft lifts , and nine arrestor wires. Aircraft could be housed in the  hangar below the flight deck. Armament comprised two 4"/50, 5"/38 or 5"/51 in single mounts, eight 40 mm anti-aircraft guns in twin mounts and twenty-one 20 mm anti-aircraft cannon in single or twin mounts. The ships had the capacity for up to eighteen aircraft which could be a mixture of Grumman Martlet, Hawker Sea Hurricane, Vought F4U Corsair fighters and Fairey Swordfish or Grumman Avenger anti-submarine aircraft.

Operational history
Pursuer served in the Home Fleet during World War II, primarily on convoy escort duty. However, on 3 April 1944, she provided fighter support for an air strike on the German battleship  in Altenfjord, Norway. On 26 April 1944 Grumman Wildcats of 882 Naval Air Squadron took part in the successful attack on a German convoy off Bodo, northern Norway. It consisted of four medium-sized supply ships and five escort craft. All four supply vessels and one of the escorts were hit with bombs and three of the supply ships were left on fire, the largest having run aground. While this attack was in progress other naval aircraft penetrated Bodo Harbour, where one large supply ship was hit by bombs and set on fire amidships. Pursuer suffered storm damage during this operation and repairs took a month to complete.

She served as an anti-submarine warfare vessel at the Battle of Normandy and in August and September 1944 she was part of a British carrier group providing air cover for the landings in southern France. The carrier was returned to United States custody on 12 February 1946, struck from the Navy Register on 28 March 1946, and sold for scrapping on 14 May that year to the Patapsco Steel Scrap Co., Bethlehem, Pennsylvania.

Citations

Bibliography

External links

 

Type C3-S-A2 ships of the Royal Navy
Attacker-class escort carriers
Ships built in Pascagoula, Mississippi
1942 ships
World War II aircraft carriers of the United Kingdom